The 1880 Connecticut gubernatorial election was held on November 2, 1880. Republican nominee Hobart B. Bigelow defeated Democratic nominee James E. English with 50.52% of the vote.

General election

Candidates
Major party candidates
Hobart B. Bigelow, Republican
James E. English, Democratic

Other candidates
Henry C. Baldwin, Greenback
George Rogers, Prohibition

Results

References

1880
Connecticut
Gubernatorial